Luri music is referred to an ethno-cultural characteristic of Lurs in the Middle East. Luri music enjoys a various and ancient background.

Music instruments 
The most popular Luri musical instruments include Sorna, Dohol, Tâl (Luri kamancheh), Tonbak (Tomak), and the common Iranian traditional instruments. Meanwhile, the Luri kamancheh is the only one    that is fundamentally different from other ethnic music instruments. The Lurs select the Mâhur as their basic musical step to showcase the magnificence, grandeur and independence of their people.

See also 
 Shahmirza Moradi

References 

 
Classical and art music traditions